ARM Architecture or Ashton Raggatt McDougall is an architectural firm with offices in Melbourne, Sydney, and Adelaide, Australia. The firm was founded in 1988 and has completed internationally renowned design work. ARM's founding directors were Stephen Ashton, Howard Raggatt, Ian McDougall.

Notable projects include the National Museum of Australia in Canberra, the Melbourne Recital Centre and Southbank Theatre in Melbourne, Perth Arena and the Marion Cultural Centre in Adelaide.

Architectural style
ARM is known for "architectural outspokenness". ARM is highly regarded for its heritage and renewal projects including the refurbishment of Hamer Hall at Arts Centre Melbourne, the redevelopment of the Shrine of Remembrance in Melbourne, RMIT Storey Hall and the redevelopment of Melbourne Central Shopping Centre. ARM was also commissioned to prepare the masterplans for Melbourne Docklands, the Adelaide Festival Plaza Precinct, and Elizabeth Quay in Perth. Recent projects include the Perth Arena and Wanangkura Stadium in Port Hedland.

A national survey of 600 architects conducted by the Architectural Review Australia found ARM to be considered the most influential architectural office in Australia in the period 1982–2007. ARM is the only Australian firm to win the Australian Institute of Architects' Premier State Award five times, most recently for the Perth Arena in Western Australia. Their design work has been featured on two Australian postage stamps.

Notable projects

ARM has designed some of Australia's landmark buildings including the following major architectural projects:

Gallery

See also

 Architecture of Australia

References

External links 

 
 Interview with Howard Raggatt and Ian McDougall on the Melbourne Recital Centre and Melbourne Theatre Company projects 
 Mongrel Rapture: The Architecture of Ashton Raggatt McDougall - book on the practice's work

Architecture firms of Australia
Architecture firms based in Victoria (Australia)
Design companies established in 1988
1988 establishments in Australia
Recipients of the Royal Australian Institute of Architects’ Gold Medal